Cheonsang Yeolcha Bunyajido is a fourteenth-century Korean star map, copies of which were spread nationwide in the Joseon Dynasty. The name is sometimes translated as the "chart of the constellations and the regions they govern."

King Taejo ordered royal astronomers to carve the constellations on a flat black stone in December, 1395. The stone is about 122.5 cm in width, 211 cm in height, and 12 cm in depth. The engraved stone shows the 1,467 stars visible from Korea, 264 constellations and their names, the ecliptic and equatorial lines, and 365 scales around. It was compiled through a combination of a Goguryeo star map with more recent observations.

The chart shows positions of the heavenly bodies in their natural order, allocated on their respective celestial fields. Its map projection law is found to be the polar equatorial and equidistance projection : the linear distance of an object on the map from the center is lineally proportional to the north polar angular distance.

The epoch of the stellar positions is estimated to be near the First Century for the stars with declination less than fifty degrees, and to be near 1395 AD for stars with declination higher than fifty degrees.

This map became standard during the Joseon dynasty, with numerous copies printed and disseminated throughout the kingdom, until it was superseded by Western planispheres in the nineteenth century.

The map is the 228th national treasure of South Korea, and is exhibited at the National Palace Museum in Seoul.

The map is now used as a background image on the reverse of the 2007 issued 10,000 won banknotes and was featured in the opening ceremonies of the 2018 Winter Olympics in PyeongChang.

See also
Yi Soon-Jee famous Korean astronomer during the Joseon dynasty,
Chil Jong-San, Korean scholar credited with having calculated the positions of five major planets and solar-lunar eclipses
Astrology

Notes
 For example, by Jeon (1998), p. 51.
 Jeon (1998), pp. 51–52. Cites a poem about the map written by Yangchon Kwon Geun.

References 

 Published originally in Mercury Magazine, Vol. 28 No. 3, May/June 1999

Star maps
History of astronomy
Joseon dynasty works
Astronomy in Korea
14th century in Korea
14th century in science
Engraving
Medieval documents
National Treasures of South Korea